The  Artificial Intelligence Cold War  (AI Cold War) is a narrative in which tensions between the US and China lead to a second Cold War waged in the area of AI technology rather than in the areas of nuclear capabilities or ideology.
The context of the AI Cold War narrative is the AI Arms Race, which involves a build-up of military capabilities using AI technology by the US and China.
A key area of concern in the tensions between China and the US are semiconductors because of their key role of semiconductors for the competitiveness of the AI industry.

Origins of the term

The term AI Cold War first appeared in 2018 in an article in 
Wired by Nicholas Thompson and Ian Bremmer. The two authors trace the emergence of the AI Cold War narrative to 2017, when China published its AI Development Plan, which included a strategy aimed at becoming the global leader in AI by 2030. While the authors acknowledge the use of AI by China to strengthen its authoritarian rule, they warn against the perils for the US of engaging in an AI Cold War strategy. Nicholas Thompson and Ian Bremmer rather advocate for a technological cooperation between the US and China to encourage global standards in privacy and ethical use of AI.

Shortly after the publication of the article in Wired magazine, the former U.S. Treasury Secretary Hank Paulson referred to the emergence of an ‘Economic Iron Curtain’ between the US and China, reinforcing the new AI Cold War narrative.

Proponents of the AI Cold War narrative

Politico contributed to reinforcing the AI Cold War narrative. In 2020, the paper argued that because of the increasing AI capabilities of China, the US and other democratic countries have to create an alliance to stay ahead of China.

Former Google CEO Eric Schmidt together with Graham T. Allison alleged in an article in Project Syndicate that, in the context of the Covid-19 pandemic, the AI capabilities of China are ahead of the US in most critical areas.

Academics have pointed to concerns about unethical use of AI which would be primarily associated with China. Ethics would therefore constitute a major ideological divide in the upcoming AI Cold War.

Fears around disrupting supply chains and a global semiconductor shortage are linked to Taiwan's critical role in the production of semiconductors. 70% of semiconductors are either produced in Taiwan or transfer through Taiwan, where TSMC, world's largest chipmaker is headquartered. China does not recognize the sovereignty of Taiwan and trade restrictions by the US on companies selling semiconductors to China have disrupted in the past the commercial relationships between TSMC and Huawei.

Restrictions to trading with China

US politicians and European industry players have invoked the looming AI Cold War as a reason to ban procurement by public authorities in Europe of Huawei 5G technology due to concerns over the Chinese state-sponsored surveillance industry.

In 2019, the  Trump administration successfully lobbied the Dutch government into stopping the Netherlands-based company  ASML  from exporting equipment to China.
ASML manufactures a machine called an extreme ultraviolet lithography system used by semiconductor producers, including TSMC and Intel to produce state-of the-art microchips.
The Biden administration adopted the same course of action as the Trump administration and requested the Netherlands to restrict sales by ASML to China, invoking national-security concerns.

The trade restrictions imposed by the Trump administration affected semiconductors imports from China to the US and raised concerns by the US industry that supply chains will be disrupted in case of an AI Cold War. This prompted US technology companies to develop mitigation strategies including hoarding semiconductors and trying to set up local semiconductor production facilities, with the support of government subsidies.

Industrial policy initiatives

United States
In June 2021, the US Senate approved the U.S. Innovation and Competition Act providing around 250 billion US dollars public money support to the US technological and manufacturing industry. The alleged Chinese threat in the area of technology helped secure a strong bipartisan support for the new legislation, amounting to the largest industrial policy move by the US in decades. Chinese authorities reproached to the US that the bill was “full of cold war zero-sum thinking”.

The legislative bill is aimed at strengthening capabilities in the area of technology, such as quantum computing and AI specifically to face the competitive threat from China perceived as urgent. Senator Chuck Schumer, the leader of the Senate majority and one of the sponsors of the industrial policy bill invoked the threat of authoritarian regimes that want “grab the mantle of global economic leadership and own the innovations”.
In 2022, U.S. Innovation and Competition Act was amended and turned into the Chips and Science Act with planned spending of 280 billion US dollars, 53 billion thereof are allocated directly to subsidies for semiconductors manufacturing.

Commentators identified possible positive effects on innovation from the US attempts to compete with China in a perceived rivalry.

Among the main benefices of the US CHIPS Act are the semiconductor producers Intel, TSMC and Micron Technology.

European Chips Act

In February 2022, the EU has introduced its own European Chips Act initiative. The background of the initiative would be the objective of European strategic autonomy. The EU's initiative puts forward subsidies of 30 billion euros to encourage manufacturing of semiconductors in the EU. The company US Intel is one beneficiary of the initiative.

Shortcomings of the AI Cold War narrative
Concerns have been expressed by academics and observers about the validity and soundness of the AI Cold War narrative.
Denise Garzia expressed concern in Nature that the AI Cold War narrative will undermine the efforts by the US to establish global rules for AI ethics.
Researchers have warned in MIT Technology Review that the breakdown in international collaboration in the area of science because of the threat of the alleged AI Cold War would be detrimental to progress. Additionally, the AI Cold War narrative impacts on many more areas including the planning of supply chains and the proliferation of AI. The dissemination of the AI Cold War narrative could therefore be costly and destructive and exacerbate existing tensions.

Joanna Bryson and Helena Malikova have pointed to Big Tech's potential interest in promoting the AI Cold War narrative, as technology companies lobby for less onerous regulation of AI in the US and the EU. A factual assessment of the existing AI capabilities of different countries shows a less binary reality than portrayed by the AI Cold War narrative.
Regarding cyber power, the International Institute for Strategic Studies published a study in June 2021, which argued that the online capabilities of China have been exaggerated and that Chinese cyber power is at least a decade behind the US, largely due to lingering security issues.

The US and European chips acts raise concerns of protectionism and a risk of a subsidies race to the bottom.

See also 

 CHIPS and Science Act
 European Chips Act
 Global Partnership on Artificial Intelligence
 Partnership on AI

References

China–United States relations
Russia–United States relations
Technological races